František Havelka (July 8, 1908 – March 21, 1973) was a Czech boxer who competed in the 1936 Summer Olympics for Czechoslovakia.  In 1936, he was eliminated in the quarter-finals of the light heavyweight class after losing his fight to Robey Leibbrandt of South Africa.

External links

František Havelka in the database of the Czech Olympic Committee

1908 births
1973 deaths
Czechoslovak male boxers
Light-heavyweight boxers
Olympic boxers of Czechoslovakia
Boxers at the 1936 Summer Olympics
Czech male boxers